L. perennis may refer to:
 Lactuca perennis, the blue lettuce or perennial lettuce,a plant species present in most of the Central and Southern Europe
 Lupinus perennis, the Indian beet, old maid's bonnets, blue lupine or sundial lupine, a plant species widespread in the eastern part of the United States

See also 
 Perennis (disambiguation)